Wolfiporia is a genus of fungi in the family Polyporaceae. The genus was circumscribed by Leif Ryvarden and Robert Lee Gilbertson in 1984 to contain the type species Wolfiporia cocos (now known as Wolfiporia extensa) and W. dilatohypha. The genus is named in honor of mycologist Frederick Adolph Wolf, who was the first to officially describe the type species.

Species list
Wolfiporia cartilaginea Ryvarden (1986)
Wolfiporia castanopsis Y.C.Dai (2011)
Wolfiporia curvispora Y.C.Dai (1998)
Wolfiporia dilatohypha Ryvarden & Gilb. (1984)
Wolfiporia extensa (synonym for Wolfiporia cocos)
Wolfiporia sulphurea (Burt) Ginns (1984)

References

Polyporaceae
Polyporales genera
Taxa named by Leif Ryvarden
Fungi described in 1984